College of Humanities and Social Sciences may refer to:

Carnegie Mellon College of Humanities and Social Sciences
North Carolina State University College of Humanities and Social Sciences
UCR College of Humanities, Arts, and Social Sciences
College of Humanities and Social Sciences (University of Sydney)
National Dong Hwa University College of Humanities and Social Sciences
Utah State University College of Humanities and Social Sciences